Saalkreis Nord was a Verwaltungsgemeinschaft ("collective municipality") in the Saalekreis district, in Saxony-Anhalt, Germany. It was situated northwest of Halle (Saale). The seat of the Verwaltungsgemeinschaft was in Wettin. It was disbanded in January 2011.

The Verwaltungsgemeinschaft Saalkreis Nord consisted of the following municipalities:

 Brachwitz 
 Döblitz 
 Domnitz 
 Gimritz 
 Löbejün
 Nauendorf 
 Neutz-Lettewitz 
 Plötz
 Rothenburg 
 Wettin

Former Verwaltungsgemeinschaften in Saxony-Anhalt